This is a list of the governors of the province of Khost, Afghanistan.

Governors of Khost Province

See also
 List of current governors of Afghanistan

Notes

Khost